KRDH-LD, virtual and VHF digital channel 5, is a low-powered SonLife-affiliated television station licensed to Denver, Colorado, United States. The station is owned by HC2 Holdings.

History 
The station’s construction permit was issued on March 16, 2007 under the calls of K05MD-D. It is assigned the callsign of KRDH-LD.

Digital channels
The station's digital signal is multiplexed:

References

External links

Low-power television stations in the United States
Innovate Corp.
RDH-LD
Television channels and stations established in 2008
2008 establishments in Colorado